Eric Damien Njuguna (born circa 2003) is a climate activist from Kenya.

Njuguna started their climate activism in 2017 after severe droughts in Nairobi impacted their school's water supply. by organizing with the group Zero Hour and then Fridays for Future Kenya. In August 2021, Njuguna co-authored an essay with Greta Thunberg, Adriana Calderón, and Farzana Faruk Jhumu that was published in The New York Times. Their co-authored essay highlighted a 2021 UNICEF report that stated 2.2 billion children are at "extremely high-risk" of experiencing the consequences of climate change. Later in 2021, Njuguna attended the 2021 United Nations Climate Change Conference (COP26) and represented Fridays for Future Kenya. At COP26, Njuguna, alongside Vanessa Nakate and Elizabeth Wathuti, met with United Nations Secretary-General Antonio Guterres to discuss climate change.

References 

Year of birth missing (living people)
Climate activists
Kenyan activists
2000s births
Living people